Kosmos 919 ( meaning Cosmos 919), also known as DS-P1-I No.19 was a satellite which was used as a radar target for anti-ballistic missile tests. It was launched by the Soviet Union in 1977 as part of the Dnepropetrovsk Sputnik programme.

It was launched aboard a Kosmos-2I 63SM rocket, from Site 133/1 at Plesetsk. The launch occurred at 10:30 UTC on 18 June 1977. It was the final flight of the Kosmos-2I carrier rocket, and the final flight of an R-12 family rocket. Kosmos launches continued using the R-14-derived Kosmos-3M. It also marked the last launch from Plesetsk Site 133/1 until it was rebuilt as Site 133/3 in 1985.

It decayed from orbit on 28 August 1978.

Kosmos 919 was the last of nineteen DS-P1-I satellites to be launched. Of these, all reached orbit successfully except the seventh.

See also

1977 in spaceflight

References

1977 in spaceflight
Kosmos satellites
Spacecraft launched in 1977
Dnepropetrovsk Sputnik program